The 7th Iowa Infantry Regiment was an infantry regiment that served in the Union Army during the American Civil War.

Service
The 7th Iowa Infantry was organized at Burlington, Iowa and assembled into Federal service between July 24 and August 4, 1861.

The regiment was sent out on July 12, 1865.

Total strength and casualties
Unit strength was 1552.  The regiment lost 7 officers and 134 enlisted men who were killed in action or who died of their wounds and 4 officers and 160 enlisted men who died of disease, for a total of 305 fatalities.  354 were wounded.

Commanders

Colonel Jacob Gartner Lauman
Colonel Elliott W. Rice
Brevet Colonel James Corner Parrot

See also
List of Iowa Civil War Units
Iowa in the American Civil War

Notes

References
The Civil War Archive

Units and formations of the Union Army from Iowa
1861 establishments in Iowa
Military units and formations established in 1861
Military units and formations disestablished in 1865